Ealdbeorht is an Anglo-Saxon name and may refer to:

 another name for Aldberht, an 8th Century Bishop of Hereford
 Ealdbeorht I, 8th century Bishop of Dunwich
 Ealdbeorht II, 8th century Bishop of Dunwich (existence unclear)